BR Heimat is a German, public radio station owned and operated by the Bayerischer Rundfunk. It broadcasts Bavarian folk music, and documentaries on tradition and culture.

References

Radio stations in Germany
Radio stations established in 2015
2015 establishments in Germany
Mass media in Munich
Bayerischer Rundfunk